Abdel Walid Yacoubou (born 9 April 1997), also known as Tulu, is a Togolese footballer who plays as a defender who currently plays for USL Championship side Hartford Athletic.

Early life
Yacoubou was born in Tel Aviv, Israel but lived in Lomé, Togo with an aunt and cousins throughout the early years of his childhood. He moved to Adelphi, Maryland in the United States at age 12 and did not play on his high school soccer team until his senior year at age 17.

Career

College
Yacoubou played college soccer for three years, beginning at Prince George's Community College in 2015, before transferring after two seasons to North Carolina Wesleyan College.

Professional 
After college, Yacoubu moved to Czech Fourth Division side HFK Třebíč, where he stayed for 3-months.

He returned to the United States to play with USL PDL side North Carolina FC U23.

In 2018, Yacoubou signed for Swedish Division 3 side IFK Holmsund.

On May 6, 2019, Yacoubou signed for USL Championship side Tulsa Roughnecks.

Following his time in Tulsa, Yacoubou signed for Portuguese side Sporting Clube Ideal.

On April 27, 2021, Yacoubou signed for USL Championship side Hartford Athletic. He scored his first goal for Hartford on July 17, 2021 in a 3–1 loss vs. Charleston Battery.

Personal life
Yavoubou is trilingual, speaking French, English, and Ewe.

References

External links
 
 
 

1997 births
Living people
Association football defenders
Togolese footballers
North Carolina FC U23 players
FC Tulsa players
Hartford Athletic players
USL Championship players
USL League Two players
Soccer players from Maryland
21st-century Togolese people